Mompesson may refer to:

Richard Mompesson (died 1627), English politician and Member of Parliament (1593)
Giles Mompesson (1583/1584–1663), Member of the British Parliament (1614–1621)
William Mompesson (1639–1709), Church of England clergyman
Roger Mompesson (c. 1661 – 1715), Member of the British Parliament (1699–1701)